is a Japanese actress, model and singer. She was named the Best Supporting Actress at the 45th Japan Academy Film Prize for her role in the film In The Wake.

Biography

Kiyohara was born on January 30, 2002, in Osaka.

Kiyohara signed as an artist under AMUSE in 2014. She has since starred in a number of dramas and movies over the years.

In 2016, Kiyohara made a cameo appearance in the film My Tomorrow, Your Yesterday starring Sota Fukushi and Nana Komatsu. She then played a supporting roles in the live-action films March Comes In like a Lion and March Goes Out like a Lamb.

Kiyohara then gained further recognition when she appeared in the final part of the Chihayafuru live-action triology, Chihayafuru Part 3 alongside the likes of Suzu Hirose and Shuhei Nomura.

Kiyohara also appeared as a cameo in the film We Made A Beautiful Bouquet which was the 8th highest grossing film in Japan in 2021.  

In May 2021, Kiyohara appeared as the heroine in NHK's 104th Asadora, Okaeri Mone. The series ran for 120 episodes.
In October 2021, Kiyohara acted alongside Takeru Satoh and Hiroshi Abe in the film In The Wake''. For her role in the film, she was named the Best Supporting Actress at the 45th Japan Academy Film Prize.

Filmography

Film

Television

Awards

References

External links
  - 
 
 

2002 births
Japanese female models
Japanese film actresses
Japanese television actresses
Living people
Models from Osaka Prefecture
Actresses from Osaka Prefecture
Japanese child actresses
21st-century Japanese actresses
Asadora lead actors